Sierra Nevada Corporation (SNC) is an American, privately held aerospace and national security contractor specializing in aircraft modification and integration, space components and systems, and related technology products for cybersecurity and health.  The company contracts with the United States Armed Forces, NASA, and private spaceflight companies. SNC is headquartered in Sparks, Nevada and has 33 locations in 19 U.S. states, the United Kingdom, Germany, and Turkey.

The company was involved in over 400 successful space missions and built the cargo Dream Chaser, which is planned to resupply the International Space Station with both pressurized and unpressurized cargo. As of July 2020, SNC has taken part in 14 different missions to Mars.

History
The company was founded in 1963 by John Chisholm with a few employees working out of an airplane hangar in the Reno Stead Airport. It was acquired in 1994 by husband and wife Fatih Ozmen and Eren Ozmen. Fatih Ozmen was one of the original employees hired by Chisholm in 1981. At the time of the Ozmens' acquiring SNC, it had around 20 employees. The company has since grown into a multi-billion dollar company with more than 4,000 employees. SNC's main business is US Department of Defense and NASA contracts.

In 2016, SNC built a  aircraft modification facility in Meridianville, Alabama, alongside Madison County Executive Airport. The company expanded, building an additional  facility, which could hold seven Beechcraft Super King Air/C-12/MC-12S planes. The company modifies commercial aircraft into military surveillance aircraft, such as the US Army's EMARSS platform.

Space systems
On December 16, 2008, SNC announced it had completed its acquisition of SpaceDev. SNC is now developing an orbital spacecraft called the Dream Chaser.

On April 14, 2021, SNC announced that it will create Sierra Space, an independent commercial space company. SNC's space business currently generates $400 million in annual revenue, and SNC is projecting revenue will increase to $4 billion in five to ten years. Sierra Space will continue to develop the reusable Dream Chaser space plane.

Dream Chaser spaceplane

On February 1, 2010, Sierra Nevada Corporation was awarded $20 million in seed money in phase 1 of NASA's Commercial Crew Development (CCDev) program for the development of the Dream Chaser. Of the $50 million awarded in the phase 1 CCDev program, Dream Chaser's award represents the largest share of the funds.

On August 3, 2012, NASA announced new agreements with the Sierra Nevada Corporation and two other companies to design and develop the next generation of U.S. human spaceflight capabilities, enabling a launch of astronauts from U.S. soil in the next five years. Advances made by these companies under newly signed Space Act Agreements through the agency's Commercial Crew Integrated Capability (CCiCap) initiative are intended to ultimately lead to the availability of commercial human spaceflight services for government and commercial customers. As part of this agreement, Sierra Nevada Corporation was awarded $212.5 million, ostensibly to continue the development and testing of its Dream Chaser spacecraft. The Dream Chaser is a revival of NASA's HL-20 Personnel Launch System lifting-body design.

On July 24, 2014, Sierra Nevada Corporation signed a letter of cooperation with Tuskegee University to collaborate on efforts related to SNC's Dream Chaser.<ref>PRWeb.com: "Tuskegee University Joins Sierra Nevada Corporation’s Dream Chaser Team", '"PRWeb, July 24, 2014</ref>

On August 1, 2014, Lockheed Martin and Sierra Nevada Corporation unveiled the composite airframe of the Dream Chaser which will be used to conduct the first orbital launch in 2016.

Internally the Dream Chaser program team is frequently referred to as the "Dream Team". The team includes well-known aerospace industry partners such as Lockheed Martin and United Launch Alliance, NASA centers and universities across the United States, small businesses such as Craig Technologies, as well as the European, German and Japanese.

On September 16, 2014, Sierra Nevada Corporation lost the Commercial Crew Transportation Capability (CCtCap) contract to SpaceX and Boeing, which were chosen by NASA as the two companies that will be funded to develop systems to transport U.S. crews to and from the space station. Boeing won $4.2 billion and SpaceX won $2.6 billion to complete and certify their spacecraft by 2017. NASA deemed SNC's proposal as less mature than the others. In the selection statement, Bill Gerstenmaier, head of NASA's human exploration and operations directorate, explained the decision by stating that "a winged spacecraft is a more complex design and thus entails more developmental and certification challenges, and therefore may have more technical and schedule risk than expected", and "I consider SNC's design to be at the lowest level of maturity, with significantly more technical work and critical design decisions to accomplish. ... SNC's proposal also has more schedule uncertainty." Director Mark Sirangelo said the team was "devastated", and called it "like a death in the family", and Washington Post said SNC "entered a realm particular to the world of government contracting: that of the big-time corporate loser".

SNC filed a protest to the GAO against the selection, which was rejected. The Washington Post called the moves to preserve the program "straddling the fine line between faith and delusion, persistence and masochism". While the Dream Chaser was designed to carry passengers, SNC modified it for cargo, worked through Thanksgiving 2015 to meet a January 2016 bidding deadline. On January 14, 2016, SNC were awarded a Commercial Resupply Services contract during CRS-2 for resupply to the International Space Station between 2019 and 2024, guaranteeing a minimum of six launches. SNC will use United Launch Alliance's Vulcan Centaur rocket as the launch vehicle for Dream Chaser's cargo configuration starting from 2022.

RocketMotorTwo

SNC was the prime contractor on RocketMotorTwo for Virgin Galactic's SpaceShipTwo, and designed the rocket engine for Scaled Composites, including the one used for SpaceshipOne. On April 29, 2013, SpaceShipTwo completed its first powered flight test using RocketMotorTwo.

After losing the bid for NASA commercial crew, Sierra Nevada reduced staff working on RocketMotorTwo in September 2014. In late November, SNC announced the permanent closure of their Poway, California propulsion development facility as they intend to consolidate all propulsion activity in one location, at the facilities of Orbital Technologies Corp.

STPSat-5
As announced on Tuesday, October 14, 2014, the United States Department of Defense awarded Sierra Nevada Corporation's Space Systems with a contract to develop and build a next-generation science and technology demonstration satellite, known as STPSat-5, for their Space Test Program.

 Artemis Human Landing System proposal 

SNC's Space Systems, working with Dynetics, participated in some early HLS design studies under NASA's HLS Appendix E program. They submitted a HLS proposal to NASA for HLS Appendix H, which was one of three proposals selected for further study, along with Blue Origin and SpaceX. NASA's Stephen Jurczyk identified the fuel drop tanks and low crew module as innovative strengths, but the propulsion system (identified by Scott Manley as SNC's Vortex engines) was a low-maturity risk. Overall, their technical rating and management rating were listed as "very good", making the Dynetics proposal the highest-rated project.

 Demonstration and Science Experiments (DSX) spacecraft 
SNC has concluded a successful two-year on-orbit research mission for the Air Force Research Laboratory (AFRL). The mission utilized SNC's Demonstration and Science Experiments (DSX) spacecraft in medium Earth orbit (MEO), and resulted in research and technologies that advance the potential future deployment of United States Department of Defense (DoD) spacecraft in the harsh radiation environment of MEO. The three successful DSX physics-based research/experiment areas include: Wave Particle Interaction Experiment (WPIx), Space Weather Experiment (SWx), and Space Environmental Effects (SFx). Robert Johnston, the principal investigator on the science side of the DSX team, commented on the DSX mission: "We will be working the science from this mission for the remainder of our careers ... DSX's contributions in understanding the environment of space are profound to our nation and the DoD."

Other projects

Predator
In 2001, SNC was producing landing gear for the Predator drone.

C-145A Skytruck
In 2009, SNC converted the Polish PZL M28 Skytruck into the C-145A Skytruck for the Air Force Special Operations Command (AFSOC). One crashed beyond repair in Afghanistan in 2011, and 11 were retired in 2015. In 2016, three were sent to Kenya, two to Costa Rica, two to Nepal, and two to Estonia. SNC took over maintenance of the AFSOC planes in 2017.

Light Air Support
Beginning in 2013, SNC partnered with Embraer to sell the Embraer EMB 314 Super Tucano as a Light Attack/Armed Reconnaissance aircraft under the USAF's A-29 Super Tucano designation.

Operators:
 Afghan Security Forces: 26 aircraft were delivered from 2014 to 2017. One part of the contract was for $1.8 billion.
 Lebanon: six aircraft delivered in 2017–2018.
 Nigeria: 12 aircraft with weapons packages. The $593 million contract had been on hold since 2015 over human rights issues, but was discussed between President Donald Trump and Nigerian President Muhammadu Buhari in February 2017 and approved later that year. The first plane was completed in 2020.
 United States:
 Air Force Special Operations Command's combat aviation advisors: three aircraft. The initial two were in a $129 million contract.

Persistent Wide-Area Airborne Surveillance
Gorgon Stare is a remotely controlled, aircraft-based Wide-Area Persistent Surveillance (WAPS) system. Gorgon Stare includes the USAF's only operational day/night persistent wide-area motion imagery (WAMI) capability. The system has flown long-duration sorties daily in multiple theaters since March 2011, providing thousands of hours of direct combat support.

In Spring 2014, the U.S. Air Force deployed the latest generation of Gorgon Stare. The fully upgraded system simultaneously provides a four-fold increase in area coverage with a two-fold improvement in resolution compared to its predecessor. The system features two state-of-the-art imaging sensor turrets—an electro-optical (EO) sensor derived from the Defense Advanced Research Projects Agency's (DARPA) ARGUS technology and an infrared (IR) sensor integrating the largest IR arrays available.

Transport Telemedicine System
SNC's Transport Telemedicine System is a capability that captures and communicates patient care and condition information beginning at the point of injury and continuing until arrival at a medical facility. On September 24, 2014, at the inaugural Nevada Telemedicine Summit, SNC successfully demonstrated the capability to the U.S. Army Medical Material Agency. The Nevada Army National Guard MEDEVAC unit flew the demonstration mission.

Multi-mission aircraft
On July 23, 2014, SNC's Intelligence, Surveillance and Reconnaissance (ISR) business area located in Centennial, Colorado, won a competitive contract to provide and operate two multi-mission aircraft (MMA) for the State of Colorado Division of Fire Prevention and Control (DFPC). Based on the Pilatus PC-12, the DFPC aircraft are equipped with electro-optical sensors and communications equipment that allow firefighters to detect small fires before they grow into large incidents that severely affect Colorado's lives, property, and resources. As a result of the integration of SNC's technology and modifications, the MMA are providing advanced fire detection, location, and behavior monitoring capabilities. Additionally, the aircraft feature a communications system that allows the aircrew to send collected information to all wildfire response personnel using the Colorado Wildfire Information Management System (CO-WIMS), a web-based collaborative information sharing tool that allows any firefighter immediate access to fire location, behavior, and other critical pieces of information. Colorado has also successfully employed the aircraft in search-and-rescue and environmental assessment missions.

In 2016, United States Customs and Border Protection (CBP) awarded SNC a $280 million firm-fixed-price contract  to  engineer and integrate 12 Multi-Role Enforcement Aircraft.

In 2020, CBP Air and Marine Operations (AMO) issued a delivery order to SNC valued at roughly $47 million for the acquisition of two Multi-Role Enforcement Aircraft (MEA). These two aircraft are the 24th and 25th ordered MEA, and are expected to be delivered early 2022.

Operators:
 US Army Task Force ODIN
 U.S. Customs and Border Protection, at least some of their 25-plane King Air fleet; 12 of the aircraft were provided in a $280 million contract in 2016.
 Royal Saudi Air Force, four planes for $185 million.
 Jamaica Defence Force, one plane acquired in 2018.
 Kuwait Air Force, four planes ordered in 2018 for $259 million with Seaspray 7500 AESA, WESCAM EO-IR imaging, communications, AN/AAR-47 missile warning system, and AN/ALE-47 countermeasures.

Dornier 328 and 328JET

In 2015, Sierra Nevada Corporation acquired 328 Support Services GmbH (328 SSG) and with it the maintenance rights and type certificates for the Dornier 328 and Fairchild-Dornier 328JET. Later in 2015 an agreement was reached for the Turkish government to build the aircraft in Turkey as the T328 and TR328 and for Turkey to develop enlarged 60-70 seat "628" models, under the Turkish Regional Jet project. First flights were anticipated in 2019, but the project was abandoned in 2017. SNC and 328 SSG would continue exploring revivals of the 328 and 328JET.

Controversy
False Claims Act lawsuit
In 2017, SNC settled a Justice Department lawsuit. The Eastern District of California's US Attorney alleged that SNC had overcharged the US government on federal contracts between 2007 and 2011, violating the False Claims Act. SNC settled without admitting liability, paying $14.9 million.

Lobbying and political influence
In 2007, the Las Vegas Sun noted SNC was "adept at targeting campaign contributions at elected officials who can help it", also noting its active Sierra Nevada PAC, which was created in July 2001.

In 2004, then-Nevada house representative and Armed Services Committee member Jim Gibbons promoted SNC to receive a $4 million no-bid helicopter technology development contract. In the same timeframe, SNC was making political consulting payments to Jim Gibbons' wife, Dawn Gibbons. Dawn was also paid by Jim's political campaign, and a nonprofit set up by the couple also paid Dawn money. These payments were exposed in 2007 by The Wall Street Journal, who also said a grand jury had convened for this and another corporation Gibbons had been entangled with.

In 2009, SNC was tied to lobbying scandals from the PMA Group and Indiana congressman and House Appropriations Subcommittee on Defense member Pete Visclosky. SNC paid PMA Group $280,000 in 2006 for lobbying, and PMA was exposed in a large lobbying scandal. A grand jury suponead Viclosky for documents and later declined to charge him. He was also cleared by the House Ethics Committee, though Visclosky declined to be interviewed by the committee, and there were "troubling aspects" uncovered in the probe. An email from SNC's Dave Klinger justified their requested contribution amounts to Viclosky, stating "He has been a good supporter of SNC. We have gotten over 10M in [earmarks]". Referring to the Klinger email, Steven V. Roberts and Cokie Roberts called the PMA/SNC relationship "a bribe by any other name".

 Wuhan Virology Institute report 

In 2020, SNC's Multi-Agency Collaboration Environment (MACE) group produced a report shared among the Department of Defense and Congress attempting to demonstrate that the Wuhan Institute of Virology shut down for several days in October, providing evidence for the COVID-19 lab leak theory. The report's evidence was based on patterns of cellphone location data around the WIV during the time period. Similar arguments had been labeled inconclusive by Western intelligence agencies after additional analysis based on satellite imagery.

The report came under heavy criticism and was the subject of a rebuttal in The Daily Beast, which pointed out that the shifting patterns in cell phone data were easily explained by observable road construction. The rebuttal also noted that the report relied on extremely small sample numbers (some as small as seven cell phones for an institute with hundreds of employees). Intelligence and health specialists interviewed by NBC were broadly skeptical of the report, the outlet reported, as were Congressional staffers quoted by The Daily Beast''.

Selected acquisitions
 ORBITEC (July 2014)
 3S Engineering (September 2012)
 SpaceDev, Inc. (December 2008)
 MicroSat Systems, Inc. (January 2008)
 WaveBand Corporation (May 2005)
 Turtle Mountain Communications, Inc. (June 2003)
 Plano Microwave, Inc. (October 2001)

See also

 SpaceDev
 NewSpace
 Top 100 US Federal Contractors
 SpaceX
 Bigelow Aerospace
 Kistler
 Thor III

References

External links

 Sierra Nevada Corporation website

Aerospace companies of the United States
American companies established in 1963
Companies based in Sparks, Nevada
Defense companies of the United States
Electronics companies of the United States
Private spaceflight companies
Privately held companies based in Nevada
Rocket engine manufacturers of the United States
Space Act Agreement companies